Zachary "Zach" Wright (born February 5, 1985) is an American-born naturalized Bosnian professional basketball player who last played for Pro A team JL Bourg. He can play at both the point guard and shooting guard positions.

Professional career
Wright's first team was SG Braunschweig of the German ProB. As a rookie pro, he led German Pro B in scoring (24.8) and steals (3.5).

This stint was followed by three seasons in the LNB Pro A in France: with Élan Chalon, Le Mans Sarthe, and Limoges CSP. Wright played at the French All-Star Game during the 2008–09 and 2010–11 seasons, and was named the slam dunk champion in the 2010–11 season.

In September 2011, he signed with Rethymno of the Greek League. He left them in March 2012, and signed with Cibona Zagreb of Croatia for the rest of the season. With Cibona he won the Croatian League

In July 2012, he signed a two-year deal with Spartak St. Petersburg of Russia. He left them after one season and signed with German EuroLeague team Brose Baskets. He left them in February 2014. On February 21, 2014, he signed with the Greek powerhouse Panathinaikos for the rest of the 2013–14 season.

In August 2014, Wright signed with İstanbul BB of Turkey for the 2014–15 season. On August 31, 2015, he signed a one-year deal with Union Olimpija of Slovenia. On March 3, 2016, he left Olimpija and signed with Avtodor Saratov of Russia for the rest of the season.

On August 9, 2016, Wright signed with AS Monaco for the 2016–17 season.

On July 14, 2017, Wright signed with SIG Strasbourg for the 2017–18 season.

On September 14, 2018, he signed with Pro A team JL Bourg.

National team career
In 2012, Wright acquired Bosnian-Herzegovinian citizenship. He played with the senior Bosnia and Herzegovina national basketball team at the EuroBasket 2013.

References

External links
Profile at Eurobasket.com
Euroleague.net profile 
 FIBA.com profile

1985 births
African-American basketball players
American expatriate basketball people in Croatia
American expatriate basketball people in France
American expatriate basketball people in Germany
American expatriate basketball people in Greece
American expatriate basketball people in Monaco
American expatriate basketball people in Russia
American expatriate basketball people in Slovenia
American expatriate basketball people in Turkey
American men's basketball players
AS Monaco Basket players
Basketball Löwen Braunschweig players
Basketball players from Texas
BC Avtodor Saratov players
BC Spartak Saint Petersburg players
Bosnia and Herzegovina men's basketball players
Bosnia and Herzegovina people of African-American descent
Brose Bamberg players
Central Missouri Mules basketball players
Élan Chalon players
İstanbul Büyükşehir Belediyespor basketball players
JL Bourg-en-Bresse players
KK Cibona players
KK Olimpija players
Le Mans Sarthe Basket players
Limoges CSP players
Living people
Little Rock Trojans men's basketball players
Naturalized citizens of Bosnia and Herzegovina
Panathinaikos B.C. players
Point guards
Rethymno B.C. players
Shooting guards
SIG Basket players
21st-century African-American sportspeople
20th-century African-American people